Tire Science and Technology is a quarterly peer-reviewed scientific journal that publishes original research and reviews on experimental, analytical, and computational aspects of tires. Since 1978, the Tire Society has published the journal. The current editor-in-chief is Michael Kaliske (Dresden University of Technology).

History

The journal was founded in 1973 and was originally published by a committee of the American Society for Testing and Materials until 1977.

Content 
Topics of interest to journal readers include adhesion, aerospace, aging, agriculture, automotive, composite materials, constitutive modeling, contact mechanics, cord mechanics, curing, design theories, durability, elastomers, finite element analysis, force and moment behavior, groove wander, heat build up, hydroplaning, impact, manufacturing, mechanics, military, noise, pavement, performance evaluation, racing, rolling resistance, snow and ice, soil, standing waves, stiffness, strength, traction, vehicle dynamics, vibration, and wear.

Past Editors 

 1977 –1982: Dan Livingston (Goodyear Tire and Rubber Company)
 1983 – 1994: Raouf Ridha (Goodyear Tire and Rubber Company)
 1995 – 1999: Jozef DeEskinazi (Continental)
 2000 – 2007: Farhad Tabaddor (Michelin)
 2008 – 2009: William V. Mars (Cooper Tire)
 2010 – present: Michael Kaliske (TU Dresden)

External links

References
  

Tires
Engineering journals
Materials science journals
Academic journals published by learned and professional societies
Publications established in 1973
English-language journals
Quarterly journals